Punctoterebra japonica is a species of sea snail, a marine gastropod mollusk in the family Terebridae, the auger snails.

Description
The size of an adult shell varies between 20 mm and 47 mm.

Distribution
This marine species is found off Japan.

References

 Bratcher T. & Cernohorsky W.O. (1987). Living terebras of the world. A monograph of the recent Terebridae of the world. American Malacologists, Melbourne, Florida & Burlington, Massachusetts. 240pp.
 Terryn Y. (2007). Terebridae: A Collectors Guide. Conchbooks & NaturalArt. 59pp + plates
 Terryn Y. & Chino M. (2019). How well are some well-known Japanese Punctoterebra really known? - A much overdue review of ‘Punctoterebra japonica'. Gloria Maris. 57(4): 124–129.

External links
 
 Smith E.A. (1873). Remarks on a few species belonging to the family Terebridae, and descriptions of several new forms in the collection of the British Museum. Annals and Magazine of Natural History. ser. 4, 11: 262-271

Terebridae
Gastropods described in 1873